The NASCAR Cup Series Championship Race is a NASCAR Cup Series stock car race held at Phoenix Raceway in Avondale, Arizona. 

It is one of five NASCAR races run with a length measured in kilometers; the Ruoff Mortgage 500 (the other Cup Series race at Phoenix which is held in the spring) and three of the Cup Series' road course events (the Toyota/Save Mart 350, Go Bowling at The Glen and Bank of America Roval 400) are the others.

History

After previously being the second-to-last race of the NASCAR Cup Series season for several years, the event became the last race of the season for the Cup Series starting in 2020, replacing the race at Homestead-Miami Speedway, and the fall race at Martinsville replaced this race as the second-to-last race of the season. In 2020, the race did not have a title sponsor and was named the Season Finale 500. NASCAR did not use that name again in 2021 and instead called it the NASCAR Cup Series Championship Race.

In its three years as the last race of the Cup Series season, the driver who won the championship also won the race: Chase Elliott in 2020, Kyle Larson in 2021 and Joey Logano in 2022.

Past winners

Notes
1998 & 2015: Race shortened due to rain.
2004, 2008, 2016 & 2018: Race extended due to NASCAR overtime.

Multiple winners (drivers)

Multiple winners (teams)

Manufacturer wins

References

External links
 

1988 establishments in Arizona
 
NASCAR Cup Series races
Recurring sporting events established in 1988
Annual sporting events in the United States